CAT is an Indian Punjabi-language crime thriller streaming television series created and written by Balwinder Singh Janjua, Rupinder Chahal, Anil Rodhan and Jimmy Singh for Netflix. It stars Randeep Hooda, Suvinder Vicky, Hasleen Kaur, Geeta Aggarwal, Dakssh Ajit Singh, Danish Sood, Jaipreet Singh, Sukhwinder Chahal, KP Singh and Kavya Thapar.This is the first OTT debut series of Randeep Hooda and Netflix first India originals in Punjabi language.

Plot 
Gurnam, who worked as a CAT for the police, during the Insurgency of the 1990s in Punjab, saves his brother Sunny from a drug peddling case with the help of a cop named Sehtab Singh. Gurnam is again hired by Sehtab to work as a spy and provide information about the drug-peddling activities in the city. While working with Sehtab, Gurnam discovers that his parents' killer Baljit Singh Rajpuria and Sehtab know are in cahoots together. This information enrages Gurnam, where he forgets his mission and is now hell-bent on avenging his parents' death.

Cast 
 Randeep Hooda as Gurnam Singh/Gary
 Abhishant Rana as teen Gary
 Danish Sood as Sunny/Sarabjit Singh, Gurnam's brother
 Suvinder Vickey as Sehtab Singh
 Geeta Agrawal as Madam Aulakh
 Neha Pawar as young Madam Aulakh 
 Kavya Thapar as Kimi Aulakh, Madam Aulakh's daughter
 Rehmat Ratan as Keerat Aulakh, Madam Aulakh's daughter
 Ajay Bhardwaj as Darbara Singh Aulakh
 Varun Narang as SSP Kamlesh Arora
 KP Singh as Jaggi Pradhan
 Sonpreet Jhawanda as Bikramjeet Singh, STF Inspector
 Gurinder Makna as Baljit Singh Rajpuria/Bill
 Jaipreet Singh as Shamsher Singh
 Sukhwinder Chahal as Mukhtyar Singh
 Pramod Pathak as Police Inspector Chandan Kumar
 Dakssh Ajit Singh as Lakhwinder Singh/Laadi
 Coral Bhamra as Sweety
 Hasleen Kaur as sub-inspector Babita
 Manish Gulati as Monty Singh
 Eklavey Kashyap as Rocky Ranjha
 Elisha Mayor as Seher Batra
 Sachin Negi as Heera
 Ramandeep Yadav as Saaba

Filming 
The session 1 of the web series was shot over 80 locations across Punjab and no single scene was shot on a set.

Episodes

Release 
CAT released on OTT platform Netflix on December 9, 2022.

Reception 
Anuj Kumar for The Hindu wrote "In the beginning, Randeep seems to be surrounded by lesser actors but as the series progresses, the earthiness of the characters renders a raw appeal. Suvinder aces the part of the two-faced police officer, Dakssh Ajeet Singh is absolutely believable as the sportsman-turned-criminal, and Abhishant Rana delivers the goods as the young Gurnam. So does the ever-reliable Pramod Pathak as the slimy cop. The performances are in sync with the locations, dialect, background score, and editing pattern and have not been dressed up to match the perceived global taste of the streaming audience."  Troy Ribeiro for The Free Press Journal gave 4/5 star rating and wrote "Diving deep into the skin of the character, it is Abhishant Rana’s intense performance as the young Gary that helps Randeep slip into the boots of Gurnam Singh with ease. Both are outstanding in their respective roles, as they leave an indelible mark on the screen." Subhash K Jha for Firstpost wrote "Morality may go fly a kite. CAT tells us ,the more we seek to find a moral centre to the world of crime the less the chances of getting anywhere close to a resolution to the moral dilemma." Abhimanyu Mathur for the Hindustan Times wrote "CAT’s novelty lies in its understanding of its setting, the earthiness of Punjab, and the lingo, of course. The show has its faults but that novelty and a stellar cast more than makes up for it." Nandini Ramnath for Scroll.in wrote "The secondary roles are staffed by a memorable array of local actors who lend the series authenticity. These include a delightful pair of twin hawala handlers – props to the casting company Anti-Casting for finding these gents." Zinia Bandyopadhyay for India Today wrote "The series excels because it remains truthful with its depiction. It does not mince or hold anything back in showing violence and gore in a world where danger and deceit lurk at every corner and the series sets the tone right at the very beginning." Deepa Gahlot for Rediff.com wrote "The series has several Sikh characters and is in Punjabi, so many viewers might need subtitles. But the language, locations, production design, costumes bring an authenticity to CAT that is praiseworthy." Archika Khurana for The Times of India wrote "Midway through, the series becomes overly indulgent and sluggish. It’s also intensely dark, with some gory killings making you cringe." Yatamanyu Narain for News18 wrote "CAT might have borrowed themes from its predecessors but it is a unique show in itself as it pertains to a vivid and macroscopic look into the plight of Punjabi hinterlands coalesced together by a compelling story and even more expeditious characters. With everything said and done, the climax of CAT might not appeal to those who are not a big fan of cliffhangers because it maintains the ‘apogee’ achieved over the course of the eight episodes for the next season." Sanchita Jhunjhunwala for Zoom TV wrote "If crime-thriller is a genre you enjoy, be rest assured to remain hooked to the Netflix series through and through." Sreeju Sudhakaran for "Latestly" wrote "CAT may have a very familiar premise and the twists aren't that unpredictable, but what works here is thrilling setup and the performances of the cast, especially Randeep Hooda and Suvinder Vicky."

See also 

 List of Netflix India originals

References 

2022 Indian television series debuts
Hindi-language Netflix original programming
Indian crime drama television series
Indian crime television series
Indian television series distributed by Netflix
Television shows set in Punjab, India